Michael A. Ruddy (September 2, 1900–June 2, 1987) was an American politician and businessman.

Ruddy was born in Chicago, Illinois. He went to the Chicago parochial and public schools. Ruddy was involved with the manufacturing and retail business. Ruddy served in the Illinois House of Representatives from 1929 to 1967 and was involved with the Republican Party. Ruddy died at his home in Oak Lawn, Illinois.

Notes

1900 births
1987 deaths
Businesspeople from Chicago
Politicians from Chicago
People from Oak Lawn, Illinois
Republican Party members of the Illinois House of Representatives
20th-century American politicians
20th-century American businesspeople